, formerly  is a developer of video games. While the company developed innovative fighting games with samurai themes, such as the Bushido Blade series and the Kengo series, it is known for its Hello Kitty games.

History
The company was founded on November 22, 1995 in Meguroku, Tokyo under managing director Tetsuo Mizuno. The developer Square Co., Ltd. initially had a 40% stake in Lightweight. Lightweight cut its ties with Square in 1998, and in March 1999, Naotaka Ueda was appointed as CEO and director of the company. The following month, developer Genki acquired a 40% stake in the company. In March 2001 Lightweight became a wholly owned subsidiary of Genki, but dissolved this connection on March 31, 2006 when Lightweight was bought by Index Visual & Games, Ltd. Ueda retired in his position in November 2008.

On November 3, 2017 the name of company went back to Lightweight Co., Ltd.

Games
Bushido Blade (1997) PlayStation
Bushido Blade 2 (1998) PlayStation
Kengo: Master of Bushido (2000) PlayStation 2
Kabuki Warriors (2001) Xbox
Kengo 2: Legacy of the Blade (2002) PlayStation 2
Crouching Tiger, Hidden Dragon (2003) PlayStation 2
Kengo 3 (2004) PlayStation 2
Hissatsu Urakagyou (2005) PlayStation 2
Eco Creatures: Save the Forest (2007) Nintendo DS
Sky Diving (2008) PlayStation 3
Hello Kitty Kruisers (2014) Wii U
Excave II: Wizard of the Underworld (2014) Nintendo 3DS
Excave III: Tower of Destiny (2015) Nintendo 3DS
Drive Girls (2017) PlayStation Vita

References

External links
 
 
 

Software companies based in Tokyo
Japanese companies established in 1995
Video game companies established in 1995
Video game companies of Japan
Video game development companies